Robert James Albo (May 8, 1932 – February 21, 2011) was an American physician, surgeon and amateur illusionist. He was for 40 years team physician for the Golden State Warriors as well as the Oakland Raiders. At one point he held the largest private magic collection in the world.

Early life and education 
Robert Albo was born in Oakland, California, on May 8, 1932, and grew up in Berkeley, California. He attended Berkeley High School, where he played basketball and helped lead the team to Tournament of Champions title in 1949. After high school, he briefly worked as an animator for Walt Disney before studying pre-med at University of California, Berkeley, where he was captain of the basketball and baseball teams. He was offered a contract with the New York Giants, but declined it to pursue a medical career.

Medical career 
Albo received his medical education at University of California, San Francisco (UCSF), graduating in 1959. He remained at UCSF for his internship and residency, and later became a professor of surgery there. His first professional job in sports medicine was with the Oakland Seals hockey team. He became team physician for the Golden State Warriors in the early 1970s, and in 1999 became the Warriors' Director of Medicine. He was also the head team physician for the Oakland Raiders and Oakland Oaks (ABA). He specialised in general, vascular, and oncological surgery.

Magic collection 

Albo was an amateur illusionist, and held a collection of magic apparatus that grew to be the world's largest, with over 4000 items. Albo used it to write his well regarded series of books, Classic Magic With Apparatus. Originally intended as a trilogy, it eventually grew to 11 volumes. It was followed by further books focused on the magic of Okito and Thayer. In 1992, selected items from the collection were displayed over three of the terminals of San Francisco International Airport. In 1994, Albo agreed to sell the entire collection to David Copperfield, though some items were not transferred to Copperfield until 2010. Albo was a partner in the Palace of Magic shop in San Francisco and Magic Island in Newport Beach, California.

Bibliography 

 Classic Magic Series
 I - The Oriental Magic of the Bambergs (1973) w/ Eric C. Lewis & David Bamberg
 II - Classic Magic With Apparatus (1976)
 III - More Classic Magic With Apparatus
 IV - Further Classic Magic With Apparatus
 V - Still Further Classic Magic With Apparatus
 VI - Final Classic Magic With Apparatus
 VII - Classic Magic Index
 VIII - Classic Magic Supplement
 IX - Additional Classic Magic With Apparatus
 X - History and Mystery of Magic
 XI - Laboratories of Legerdemain
 Magic of the United States
 Magic of France
 Magic of Germany
 Magic of England
 The Ultimate Okito
 The Ultimate Okito Addendum
 The Ultimate Okito Encore
 The Ultimate Thayer
 Thoughts on the History and Mystery of Magic

Awards 
 The Academy of Magical Arts Special Fellowship (1983)
 The Academy of Magical Arts Literary & Media Fellowship (1988)
 The John Neville Maskelyne Prize 1989

References 

1932 births
2011 deaths
American surgeons
American sports physicians
University of California, Berkeley alumni
University of California, San Francisco alumni
Historians of magic
Academy of Magical Arts Literature & Media Fellowship winners
Academy of Magical Arts Special Fellowship winners